Bagongbanwa is an island located in the Cebu Strait in the Philippines. The island is under the administration of Barangay Bagongbanwa, municipality of Tubigon, Bohol. Bagongbanwa is one of the islands that form the Danajon Bank, the only double barrier reef in the country. Most of the residents are engaged in fishing. Based on the latest census, the population of the island is 1,172. 

The island has an elementary and high school. Bagongbanwa has its own diesel power plant operated by NAPOCOR.

See also

 List of islands by population density

References

Islands of Bohol